Jose Lopez Manzano Tuy National High School (JLMTNHS) is a school in the municipality of Tuy, Batangas, Philippines averaging a 400 enrollments annually. It was founded in 2009 and is originally called Tuy Community High School. It follows the Philippines Basic Educational Curriculum and also held  Special Science Curriculum with computer integration.

References 

 
 
 Department of Education, Republic of the Philippines

High schools in Batangas